Kür Qaraqaşlı (also, Kyurkarakashly, Korakashly, and Kyurkara Kashly) is a village and municipality in the Salyan Rayon of Azerbaijan.  It has a population of 2,484.

References 

Populated places in Salyan District (Azerbaijan)